Claire Sherred (born 5 November 1956) is a British luger. She competed in the women's singles event at the 1984 Winter Olympics.

References

External links
 

1956 births
Living people
British female lugers
Olympic lugers of Great Britain
Lugers at the 1984 Winter Olympics
People from Croydon